"We Are all Americans (Allegiance)' is a song written during World War I with music composed by Carrie Jacobs-Bond and lyrics written by Fanny Hodges Newman.  It is found in the Library of Congress record of notable music.  

A similar song in feeling with the same title from 1914 by O. S. Grinnell was "dedicated to those unemployed as a result of the war." 

Jacobs-Bond's song was one of more than 4,500 patriotic songs written in 1918 and the second song of that name composed in Chicago that year. "We Are All Americans (Allegiance)" is composed of three verses, was originally written for a voice and piano format, and is addressed to "Miss Margaret Woodrow Wilson".

See also 
 Carrie Jacobs-Bond
 Pritzker Military Museum & Library
 War song

External links 
 Broadsheet
View song MP3 and sheet music at the Illinois Digital Archive

References 

Songs about the United States
Nationalism in the United States
American patriotic songs
1918 songs
Songs of World War I
Songs written by Carrie Jacobs-Bond